Sérgio Mota Mello (born November 16, 1989 in São José dos Campos), is a Brazilian attacking midfielder who currently plays for Vitória.

Club career
Sérgio Mota would make his professional debut for top tier club São Paulo in a 0-2 away defeat to Juventude in the Campeonato Brasileiro on November 8, 2007. He would be part of the squad that won the 2007 and Campeonato Brasileiro Série A 2008 championships. To gain more playing opportunities he was loaned to Toledo, Ceará and Icasa.

On 1 February 2012, he was loaned to Santo André and he made his debut for the club 18 February 2012 in a Campeonato Paulista Série A2 game against Velo Clube in a 3-0 defeat. Despite the defeat he would make a permanent move to Santo André, however he only stayed for one season before joining Penapolense. With brief loan periods at América-MG and Botafogo-SP he would go abroad for the first time when he joined Seattle Sounders FC 2.  
 
After only one season he returned to Brazil and joined Luverdense and quickly established himself as in integral member of the team before joining CRB.

Career statistics 
Statistics accurate as of match played 31 December 2020.

Honours

Club
São Paulo
Campeonato Brasileiro Série A: 2007, 2008

Luverdense
 Campeonato Mato-Grossense: 2016

CRB
 Campeonato Alagoano: 2017

References

External links

CBF  

1989 births
Living people
People from São José dos Campos
Brazilian footballers
Brazilian expatriate sportspeople in the United States
Campeonato Brasileiro Série A players
Campeonato Brasileiro Série B players
USL Championship players
São Paulo FC players
Ceará Sporting Club players
Associação Desportiva Recreativa e Cultural Icasa players
Esporte Clube Santo André players
América Futebol Clube (MG) players
Botafogo Futebol Clube (SP) players
Tacoma Defiance players
Luverdense Esporte Clube players
Zhejiang Yiteng F.C. players
Guizhou F.C. players
China League One players
Clube de Regatas Brasil players
Esporte Clube Vitória players
Brazilian expatriate footballers
Expatriate soccer players in the United States
Expatriate footballers in China
Brazilian expatriate sportspeople in China
Association football midfielders
Footballers from São Paulo (state)